Krokava is a village and municipality in the Rimavská Sobota District of the Banská Bystrica Region of southern Slovakia. Originally a shepherd settlement, locals later engaged in raising cattle and weaving. One of the most notable attractions of Krokava is the village belfry.

References

External links
 
 
https://web.archive.org/web/20160803222630/http://krokava.e-obce.sk/

Villages and municipalities in Rimavská Sobota District